Burgundus was the mythical founder of the Burgundian tribe.  He was named as one of the five sons of Armenon, or Irmin, in Nennius' Historia Brittonum . Irmin was the son of Mannus (Alanus in the Historia Brittonum), in myth variously a war god or the first man to dwell in Europe.

Burgundians